The 1921–22 season was the 30th season of The Football League.

This year the Third Division was divided into North and South sections.  Third Division South continued the single new Third Division of the previous season. Two new clubs were placed in Third Division South, while 18 of 20 newcomers were placed in Third Division North, as the number of Football League clubs increased from 66 to 86.

Final league tables
The tables and results below are reproduced here in the exact form that they can be found at The Rec.Sport.Soccer Statistics Foundation website and in Rothmans Book of Football League Records 1888–89 to 1978–79, with home and away statistics separated.

First Division

Results

First Division maps

Second Division

Results

Second Division maps

Third Division North

Results

Source:

Maps

Third Division South

Results

Maps

See also
1921 in association football
1922 in association football

References

English Football League seasons